LFH Division 1 Féminine, known for sponsorship reasons as Ligue Butagaz Énergie, is the premier women's handball league in France. It is overseen by the Ligue Féminine de Handball (LFH), the governing body of French women's professional handball, under delegation from the French Handball Federation (FFHB). Founded in 1952, it is currently contested by twelve teams.

Metz Handball has dominated the championship in recent times with 24 titles between 1989 and 2022 including a 6-year winning streak, while US Ivry and Paris UC were the most successful teams in past decades with nine and five titles respectively.

As of 2022:
 Brest Bretagne Handball is the french club that went the furthest in the EHF Champions League: they were finalist in 2021.
 The EHF European League has been won by only one french club: Neptunes de Nantes in 2021.

Participating teams

2022–23 teams

Personnel and kits

Competition format 
All 14 teams play each other twice during the season (home and away matches – 26 competition days). At the end of the season, the best ranked team is declared "Champion de France" and is granted a spot in the EHF Champions League's group stage.

The last ranked team (14th) is relegated to the lower echelon of women's handball Division 2 Féminine (D2F) and replaced by the top-ranked D2F team that possesses the  status.

Teams receive three points for a win, two points for a draw and one point for a loss.

European qualification 
Currently the Champion of France is granted a spot in the EHF Champions League's group stage. Runner-up is qualified for the EHF European League but is able to apply for a wildcard (upgrade) to participate in the Champions League. The winner of the Coupe de France is qualified for the EHF European League. If a qualified team declines to participate in the European League, the next best-ranked team in the league can apply to take their place. A number of the league's other top teams are eligible to participate in European competitions.

The number of teams per national federation qualified for European competitions (EHF Champions League and EHF European League) is determined by a federation's EHF coefficient and EHF rank. Each year, the EHF publishes a ranking that announces the place attribution for the following season (number of teams for each Federation in the various competitions).

For the 2023/24 season, the system changed. The coefficients and ranks were not determined by the overall performance of a federation, as it used to be. The performances are separated by competitions (e.g.: good performance by french teams in the Champions League would not allocate more places for french teams in the European League). Thus, the new system includes separate rankings for the Champions League and the European League.

Place distribution for 2023/24 Women's EHF Club competitions - France's place attribution:
 EHF Champions League (EHF CL): 1 place
 EHF European League (EHF EL): 3 places

The Champions League has 7 other spots open for clubs that are not national champions but have qualified for the European League (1 spot for the best seeded Federation of the EHF EL and 6 spots open for upgrades). The EHF European League has 8 spots open in for upgrades.

A club needs to fulfill set technical and organizational or administrative requirements to be able to play in European competitions (finances, adequate playing hall, etc.).

List of champions
{{Quote box
| class = 
| title =
| quote = Note - former names of clubs:
 Brest Bretagne Handball: Arvor 29
 ES Colombes: CSA Molière
 JDA Dijon Bourgogne HB: CSL Dijon & Cercle Dijon Bourgogne
 Mérignac Handball: Sport athlétique mérignacais
 Metz Handball: ASPTT Metz, HB Metz métropole
 [[Nantes Atlantique Handball|Neptunes de Nantes]]: Nantes Atlantique HB
 Paris 92: Issy-les-Moulineaux & Issy Paris Hand
 Stade nantais université club: SNUC Atlantique / Stade Nantes UCA
 Toulon Métropole Var HB: Toulon Saint-Cyr Var HB
| author =
| source =
| align = right
| width =
| border =
| fontsize =
| bgcolor =
| style =
| title_bg =
| title_fnt =
| tstyle =
| qalign =
| qstyle =
| quoted =
| salign =
| sstyle =
}}

 Media coverage 
 Free 
 Sport en France (national wide sport TV channel) usually broadcasts 2 matches per "competition day".
 Moselle TV (local TV channel) broadcasts a few of Metz Handball home matches.
 NA TV (local TV channel) broadcasts a few of HBC Celles-sur-Belle home matches, since the 2022/23 season.
 Tébéo (local TV channel) broadcasts a few of Brest Bretagne Handball home matches.

 Pay-to-watch "Handball TV"': For the 2022-23 handball season, the French Federation of Handball launched its own subscription video on-demand over-the-top streaming service:
 It re-broadcasts the live feeds of free TV channels (that broadcast matches).
 it also broadcasts live some exclusive matches.
 VODs (replays) of all broadcast matches.

Notable foreign playersList of foreign players who previously played or currently play in the LFH Division 1 Féminine. Bold indicate players currently playing in the league (2022/2023).

Algeria
  Nadia Belakhdar
  Nabila Tizi
Angola
  Stelvia de Jesus Pascoal
  Isabel Guialo
  Ruth João
Argentina
  Elke Karsten
  Luciana Mendoza
  Rosario Urban
Australia
  Catherine Kent
  Manon Livingstone
Austria
  Gorica Aćimović
  Petra Blazek
  Sonja Frey
Belarus
  Natallia Vasileuskaya
Brazil
  Moniky Bancilon
  Ana Paula Belo
  Adriana Cardoso de Castro
  Deonise Cavaleiro
  Bruna de Paula
  Fabiana Diniz
  Alexandra do Nascimento
  Elaine Gomes
  Mayara Moura
  Gabriela Moreschi
  Mayssa Pessoa
  Silvia Pinheiro
  Samira Rocha
Cameroon
  Lisa Atangana
  
Croatia
  Maida Arslanagić
  Sonja Bašić
  Klaudija Bubalo
  Ivana Dežić
  Dragica Džono
  Kristina Elez
  Lidija Horvat
  Ivana Kapitanović
  Ćamila Mičijević
  Ivana Lovrić
Cuba
  Eyatne Rizo
Czech Republic
  Klára Černá
  Lenka Černá
  Kamila Kordovská
  Petra Kudláčková
  Iveta Luzumová
  Veronika Malá
  Pavla Poznarová
  Helena Ryšánková
  Barbora Raníková
  Lucie Satrapová
  Helena Štěrbová
Democratic Republic of the Congo
  Luisa Makubanza
  Estel Memana
  Christianne Mwasesa
  Simone Thiero
Denmark
  Melanie Bak
  Louise Burgaard
  Stine Bodholt Nielsen
  Lotte Grigel
  Kristina Jørgensen
  Mai Kragballe Nielsen
  
  
  Mia Møldrup
  Nadia Offendal
  Julie Pontoppidan
  Jane Schumacher
  Sandra Toft
  Line Uno
  Ditte Vind
  Anna Wierzba
  Fie Woller
Egypt
  Ehsan Abdelmalek
Germany
  Dinah Eckerle
  Isabell Klein
  Ewgenija Minevskaja
  Maike Schirmer
  Xenia Smits
  Aimée von Pereira
Hungary
  Viktória Csáki
  Andrea Farkas
  Ágnes Hornyák
  Szabina Mayer
  Krisztina Pigniczki
  Szimonetta Planéta
  Szabina Tápai
Iceland
  Karen Knútsdóttir
  Arna Sif Pálsdóttir
  Ramune Pekarskyte
  Hrafnhildur Hanna Þrastardóttir
Ivory Coast
  Paula Gondo-Bredou
Japan
  Sakura Hauge
Montenegro
  Jasna Boljević
  Tatjana Brnović
  Itana Grbić
  Đurđina Jauković
  Marija Jovanović
  Đurđina Malović
  Jasna Tošković
  Dijana Ujkić
  Marina Vukčević
Netherlands
  Lois Abbingh
  Debbie Bont
  Yvette Broch
  Merel Freriks
  Jasmina Janković
  Isabelle Jongenelen
  Jessy Kramer
  Jurswailly Luciano
  Anouk Nieuwenweg
  Charris Rozemalen
  Esther Schop
  Martine Smeets
  Laura van der Heijden
  Sanne van Olphen
  Marieke van der Wal
  Pearl van der Wissel
  
North Macedonia
  Dragica Kresoja
  Jovana Micevska
  Julija Portjanko
Norway
  Mari Finstad Bergum
  Camilla Carstens
  Helene Gigstad Fauske
  Rikke Marie Granlund
  Anette Helene Hansen
  Malin Holta
  Tonje Haug Lerstad
  Tonje Løseth
  Karoline Lund
  Hanna Bredal Oftedal
  Stine Bredal Oftedal
  Siv Heim Sæbøe
  
  Celine Sivertsen
  Silje Solberg
  Pernille Wibe
Poland
  Marta Gęga
  Katarzyna Janiszewska
  Monika Kobylińska
  Aneta Łabuda
  Natalia Nosek
  Adrianna Płaczek
  Aleksandra Rosiak
  Monika Stachowska
  Karolina Siódmiak
  Ewa Urtnowska
  Paulina Uścinowicz
  Joanna Wołoszyk
  Karolina Zalewska
  Aleksandra Zych
Portugal
  Joana Resende
Republic of Congo
  Joséphine Nkou
Romania
  Carmen Amariei
  Melinda Geiger
  Ionica Munteanu
  Elena Napăr
  Crina Pintea
  Ionela Stanca
Russia
  Ekaterina Andryushina
  Yulia Khavronina
  Valeriia Maslova
Senegal
  Doungou Camara
  Raïssa Dapina
  Laura Kamdop
  Hawa N'Diaye
  Amina Sankharé
  Dienaba Sy
Serbia
  Marija Čolić
  Biljana Filipović
  
  Kristina Liščević
  Tatjana Medved
  Svetlana Ognjenović
  Slađana Pop-Lazić
  Jelena Popović
  Dijana Radojević
  Dijana Števin
  Jovana Stoiljković
  Katarina Tomašević
Slovakia
  Monika Rajnohová
  Martina Školková
Slovenia
  Aneja Beganovič
  Ana Gros
  Nina Jeriček
  Lina Krhlikar
  Amra Pandžić
  Tjaša Stanko
  Maja Vojnović
South Korea
  Ryu Eun-hee
Spain
  Nely Carla Alberto
  Jessica Alonso
  Alexandrina Cabral
  Carmen Campos
  Mercedes Castellanos
  Elisabet Cesáreo
  Elisabeth Chávez
  Darly de Paula
  Patricia Elorza
  Beatriz Escribano
  Beatriz Fernández
  Paula García Ávila
  Kaba Gassama
  Lara González Ortega
  Mireya González
  Marta López
  Marta Mangué
  Carmen Martín
  María Muñoz Juan
  María Núñez
  Paula Valdivia Monserrat
Sweden
  Hanna Åhlén
  Jenny Carlson
  
  Kristina Flognman
  Tina Flognman
  Hanna Fogelström
  Cecilia Grubbström
  Isabelle Gulldén
  Nathalie Hagman
  Filippa Idéhn
  Therese Islas Helgesson
  Anna Lagerquist
  Clara Monti Danielsson
  Louise Sand
  Carin Strömberg
  Frida Tegstedt
  Ulrika Toft Hansen
  Cassandra Tollbring
  Linnea Torstenson
  Angelica Wallén
Switzerland
  Daphne Gautschi
  Lea Schüpbach
Tunisia
  Haifa Abdelhak
  Noura Ben Slama
  Takoua Chabchoub
  Mouna Chebbah
  Maroua Dhaouadi
  Asma Elghaoui
  Ines Khouildi
  Ouided Kilani
  Rafika Marzouk
  Faten Yahiaoui
Ukraine
  Liliia Gorilska
  Olha Nikolayenko
  Olga Perederiy
  Anastasiia Pidpalova
  Yuliya Snopova

EHF league ranking 
EHF League Ranking for 2022/23 season:
 1.  (1)  Nemzeti Bajnokság I (157.67)
 2.  (5)  Ligue Butagaz Énergie (118.50)
 3.  (2)  Russian Superleague (114.50)
 4.  (3)  Bambusa Kvindeligaen (109.00)
 5.  (6)  REMA 1000-ligaen (102.77)
 6.  (4)  Liga Națională (94.50)

See also 
 Coupe de France
 LFH Division 2 Féminine, the lower echelon French women's league
 LNH Division 1 (Liqui Moly Starligue), the corresponding men's competition
 LNH Division 2 (ProLigue), the corresponding men's competition
 List of handball clubs in France
 Women's sports

References

External links
 Official website

France
women
Women's handball in France
Women's sports leagues in France
Professional sports leagues in France